"Spooky" is originally an instrumental song performed by saxophonist Mike Sharpe (Shapiro), written by Shapiro and Harry Middlebrooks Jr, which first charted in 1967 hitting No. 57 on the US pop charts. Its best-known version was created by James Cobb and producer Buddy Buie for the group Classics IV when they added lyrics about a "spooky little girl". The vocalist was Dennis Yost. The song is noted for its eerie whistling sound effect depicting the spooky little girl. It has become a Halloween favorite. In 1968, the vocal version reached No. 3 on the U.S. Billboard Hot 100 and No. 46 in the UK.

Charts

Weekly charts

Year-end charts

Atlanta Rhythm Section version

J.R. Cobb and bandmate Dean Daughtry later became part of the Atlanta Rhythm Section and re-recorded "Spooky" in 1979, also produced by Buie.  It was the second of two singles released from their Underdog LP.

ARS's version hit No. 17 in the US on Billboard and No. 15 on Cash Box. It also charted minorly internationally.

Charts

Other notable versions
A version of "Spooky" was recorded by Dusty Springfield in 1970, released as a single worldwide except in the US.  This gender-flipped version was featured prominently in the Guy Ritchie film Lock, Stock and Two Smoking Barrels. Springfield's version was certified silver by BPI in 2022. 

Another gender-flipped version was recorded by Martha Reeves and released on the album In the Midnight Hour in 1986. In this version, the line "spooky little girl" is changed to "spooky old lady".

References

External links
 
 

1967 songs
1967 singles
1979 singles
Classics IV songs
Dusty Springfield songs
Atlanta Rhythm Section songs
Shakin' Stevens songs
Vicious Pink songs
Imperial Records singles
Polydor Records singles
Songs written by J. R. Cobb
Songs written by Buddy Buie
1960s instrumentals
Halloween songs
RPM Top Singles number-one singles